Kichmenga is a rural locality (a selo) in Gorodetskoye Rural Settlement, Kichmengsko-Gorodetsky District, Vologda Oblast, Russia. The population was 250 as of 2002. There are 10 streets.

Geography 
Kichmenga is located 19 km northwest of Kichmengsky Gorodok (the district's administrative centre) by road. Byakovo is the nearest rural locality.

References 

Rural localities in Kichmengsko-Gorodetsky District